Myung-hee, also spelled Myong-hui, Myeong-hui, or Myeong-hee, is a Korean unisex given name. Its meaning differs based on the hanja used to write each syllable of the name.

Hanja
There are 19 hanja with the reading "myung" and 24 hanja with the reading "hee" on the South Korean government's official list of hanja which may be registered for use in given names. Examples include:

 ( moksum myeong "life";  bitnal hui "shining")
 ( balgeul myeong "bright";  bitnal hui "shining")
 (feminine;  balgeul myeong "bright",  yeoja hui "woman")

People
People with this name include:

Sportspeople
Sim Myeong-hui (born 1925), South Korean male sport shooter
Han Myeong-hui (born 1945), South Korean female sprinter
Mo Myeong-hui (born 1963), South Korean female sprinter
Lee Myeong-hui (born 1963), South Korean female volleyball player
Chung Myung-hee (born 1964), South Korean female badminton player
Jeong Myung-hee (born 1964), South Korean female basketball player
Choi Myong-hui (born 1966), North Korean female gymnast
Jang Myeong-hui (born 1969), South Korean female rower
Lee Meong-hee (born 1978), South Korean female volleyball player
Jon Myong-hui (born 1986), North Korean female football goalkeeper
Hong Myong-hui (footballer) (born 1991), North Korean female football goalkeeper

Others
Gim Myeong-hui (1788–?), Joseon Dynasty male calligrapher
Hong Myong-hui (1888–1968), North Korean male novelist
Lee Myung-hee (born 1943), South Korean businesswoman, chair of the Shinsegae Group
Yu Myeong-Hee (born 1954), South Korean female microbiologist
Yoo Myung-hee (born 1967), South Korean female politician
Ri Myong-hui, North Korean female singer, member of Moranbong Band

See also
List of Korean given names

References

Korean unisex given names